Schellenberg is a toponymic surname derived from any of various places in Germany and Switzerland. Notable people with the surname include:

Aldo C. Schellenberg (born 1958), Swiss military officer
August Schellenberg (1936–2013), Canadian actor
Glenn Schellenberg, Canadian composer and professor
Harry Schellenberg, Canadian politician
Hans Conrad Schellenberg (1872–1923), Swiss botanist and agronomist
J. L. Schellenberg (born 1959), Canadian philosopher and professor
Johann Rudolph Schellenberg (1740–1806), Swiss artist, writer and entomologist
Joseph von Schellenberg (1735–1801), Austrian infantry commander
Katharina Schellenberg (1870–1945), American medical missionary
Keith Schellenberg (1929–2019), English businessman and former Olympic bobsledder
Max Schellenberg (1927–2000), Swiss racing cyclist
Robert Lloyd Schellenberg (born 1982), Canadian criminal
Susanna Schellenberg (born 1979), Lebanese professor and author
T. R. Schellenberg (1903–1970), American archivist and archival theorist
Ted Schellenberg (born 1952), Canadian broadcaster and former politician
Tobias Schellenberg (born 1978), German diver
Walter Schellenberg (1910–1952), German SS functionary

See also
Schellenberg
Schellenberger
Shellenberger

Toponymic surnames
Russian Mennonite surnames
fr:Schellenberg (homonymie)